Nové Sedlo is a town in Sokolov District in the Karlovy Vary Region of the Czech Republic. It has about 2,600 inhabitants.

Administrative parts
Villages of Chranišov and Loučky are administrative parts of Nové Sedlo.

Twin towns – sister cities

Nové Sedlo is twinned with:
 Schwarzenberg, Germany

References

External links

Cities and towns in the Czech Republic
Populated places in Sokolov District